Bloodshed (real name Wyndell Dichinson) is a fictional supervillain appearing in American comic books published by Marvel Comics. It is also the name of a supervillain in Marvel's Razorline imprint, as well as a character in comics from an acquired company, Malibu Comics.

Publication history

Bloodshed first appeared in Web of Spider-Man #81 (October 1991), and was created by Kurt Busiek and Steven Butler.

Fictional character biography
Wyndell Dichinson and his 16-year-old brother are caught in a car theft by the heroic Spider-Man and apprehended by the police. Ricky goes to jail but Wyndell manages to escape and flee the country before his court date takes place. He becomes a mercenary somewhere in the Far East. He begins work in Thailand, where he is approached and employed by Mr. Bazin.

Wyndell fails an American drug smuggling operation for Bazin and ends up deep in debt. He approaches his brother to ask for money; at that point he has only three days left to pay. Bazin became impatient and decided he wanted Bloodshed dead. Wyndell and his brother are confronted by gangsters, which catches the attention of Spider-Man. In the meantime, Bazin had placed a bomb in Ricky's home. It explodes, seemingly erasing all traces of the brothers. Spider-Man presumes them to be dead.

Civil War
Bloodshed is revealed alive during the Civil War event and when the registration law is announced, he decides to leave the country again. He contacts Vienna to make him a new fake identity, but he did not know Vienna is secretly working for the Heroes for Hire, who later apprehend Bloodshed and several other supervillains.

Later in Civil War: War Crimes, he is visible among an army of super-villains organized by Hammerhead.  Although this grouping is captured by Iron Man and S.H.I.E.L.D. agents, Bloodshed's fate in the ensuing melee is unknown.

Dark Reign
Bloodshed is part of Hood's crime syndicate during an attack on Mister Negative.

Powers and abilities
Bloodshed has super durable skin capable of deflecting bullets. When the building fell on top of him he admitted he would have survived but would have suffocated from the rubble.  Bloodshed also has super strength capable of smashing through walls and floors. Bloodshed has been trained as a mercenary for a number of years and is a skilled fighter. He wears specialized armor and retractable bladed weapons on his suit.

Other characters named Bloodshed
In Marvel's Razorline imprint, Bloodshed is the name of a supervillain in a four-issue arc of Hokum & Hex.
In the Ultraverse, a member of the Dragon Fang is known as Bloodshed. He first appeared in Solution #1.

References

External links

Comics characters introduced in 1991
Characters created by Kurt Busiek
Marvel Comics characters with superhuman strength
Marvel Comics male supervillains
Marvel Comics supervillains
Fictional characters with superhuman durability or invulnerability
Fictional mercenaries in comics